Find Your Man is a 1924 American silent action/drama film starring Rin Tin Tin and June Marlowe. It was directed by Mal St. Clair who persuaded Warner Bros. to hire his friend, Darryl F. Zanuck, to write the screenplay; this began a long association between Zanuck and Rin Tin Tin. Filming took place in Klamath Falls, Oregon. This film survives. It was transferred onto 16mm film by Associated Artists Productions in the 1950s and shown on television.

Cast
June Marlowe -  Carolina Blair
Rin Tin Tin -  Buddy, a dog
Eric St. Clair -  Paul Andrews
Charles Hill Mailes -  Gregory Mills
Pat Hartigan -  Martin Dains
Fred R. Stanton -  Sheriff
Lew Harvey -  Half-Breed
Heinie Conklin - Lumberjack

Box Office
According to Warner Bros records the film earned $283,000 domestically and $43,000 foreign.

References

External links
 
Find Your Man at Silent Hollywood
Find Your Man at Rin Tin Tin Movie Star
lobby poster

1924 films
1920s action drama films
American silent feature films
American black-and-white films
Films directed by Malcolm St. Clair
Films shot in Oregon
Warner Bros. films
American action drama films
Surviving American silent films
Rin Tin Tin
1924 drama films
1920s American films
Silent American drama films
Silent action drama films